Patrick E. Kelly is the fourteenth and current Supreme Knight of the Knights of Columbus. He was the founding executive director of the Saint John Paul II National Shrine in Washington, D.C. In February 2021, he was elected by the board of directors to succeed Carl A. Anderson as the Supreme Knight of the Knights of Columbus. His term started on March 1, 2021 and he was formally installed on June 11, 2021.

Early career

Kelly was a captain in the U.S. Navy Judge Advocate General's (JAG) Corps Reserve. He specialized in international and operational law, and retired in 2016 after 24 years of service.  He also served as the Commanding Officer of the international law unit at the United States Naval War College.  He serves on the Council of Advisers at the Center for the Study of Statesmanship at Catholic University.

In other roles, Kelly worked as Legislative Counsel to the Permanent Select Committee on Intelligence in the U.S. House of Representatives, and the Department of Justice.  He was also the Senior Advisor to the Ambassador-at-Large for International Religious Freedom at the State Department.  In this position, he was the State Department's primary contact with the Holy See and other nations on matters of religious freedom.

As of 2012, he was the chairman of the March for Life Education & Defense Fund.

Leadership of the Knights of Columbus 

Kelly is a Past State Deputy of the District of Columbia and was elected to the board of directors in 2013.  He became Deputy Supreme Knight on January 1, 2017.  In 2006 he became the Order's vice president for Public Policy, and served as the executive director of the Saint John Paul II National Shrine in Washington, D.C., which is owned and operated by the Knights, from 2011 to 2020.  He has been a Knight since 1983.

Kelly was formally installed as the 14th Supreme Knight of the Knights of Columbus on June 11, 2021.

Dobbs decision overturning Roe 

In the wake of the Dobbs v. Jackson Women's Health Organization decision in 2022, Kelly said, "In a post-Roe world, the Knights will continue to be there for mothers and their children, and we will continue to proclaim the dignity of every human life.”"

Kelly also said, "Roe v. Wade is finally gone. We now have a chance to win the fight for life...by ending Roe, the court has empowered us to end one of the worst injustices in American history. Roe is overturned, but we have more work to do. We will continue to march for life until abortion is unthinkable." He suggested that the Knights would continue to be politically active with respect to abortion: "Each state has a choice to make. At least half will protect life to some degree. But others will keep the abortion status quo. And some states will even expand abortion, putting mothers and children in greater danger."

Kelly expressed support for a program started by the Knights in 2019 to donate ultrasound machines to pregnancy centers. The 1,500th machine was donated in January 2022. The national council pays half of the cost of each machine, while local chapters pay the other half.

Evangelization 

In his first speech to the Knights' annual gathering after becoming its Supreme Knight, Kelly said that evangelization will be a top priority in his leadership: "When I look back on the order's history, I see evangelization in virtually everything we've done. Yet today, there is a special urgency."

Supporting the National Eucharistic Revival -- a project of the United States Conference of Catholic Bishops launched in 2020 -- is one way the Knights under Kelly are supporting evangelization.

Personal life 
Kelly and his wife, Vanessa, are the parents of three daughters.  He received a bachelor's degree in economics from Marquette University, a master's in theology from the Pontifical John Paul II Institute for Studies on Marriage and Family at The Catholic University of America, and a law degree from Marquette University Law School in 1993.  Kelly grew up as one of seven siblings in Michigan.

References 

Lawyers from Washington, D.C.
Roman Catholic activists
Catholic University of America alumni
Living people
Marquette University alumni
Place of birth missing (living people)
Year of birth missing (living people)
United States Navy officers
Deputy Supreme Knights of the Knights of Columbus
Supreme Knights of the Knights of Columbus